Paprenjak are a traditional biscuit made in Croatia. This peculiar biscuit contains a unique mix of honey and black pepper. The main ingredients are sugar syrup or honey, butter or fat, eggs, nuts (walnuts, hazelnuts), pepper and various spices (clove, cinnamon, nutmeg). Apart from the ingredients, Paprenjak is unique with its mould-pressed motifs used to decorate the biscuit. (see picture)

The Croatian author August Senoa featured the biscuit in his novel "Goldsmith's gold" published in 1871: 

“And thus it came to pass that she was called the Paprenjak lady: over the length and breadth of the city there was not a woman, noble or common, who could bake paprenjaks in the way that Magda knew. Day in and day out there was a run on her paprenjaks, and the city judge Ivan Blažeković himself was known to leave a pretty penny in her purse every so often.”

Croatian Tradition
The origins of paprenjak are unclear but they are known to have existed in the 16th century during the Renaissance. Traditionally, in older times, Croatian people made paprenjak throughout the year, and more lately it is a family tradition in many homes to make paprenjak for Christmas – an event in which the whole family would come together, mothers and grandmothers to make the dough and children to stamp out the paprenjak shapes for Christmas.

Traditionally, a square paprenjak is decorated with wooden press, embossing a pattern on the biscuit. These patterns were traditionally pagan and Christian symbols, such as fish, wheat or sun. Today paprenjak today takes on many shapes, such as gingerbread men, stars, trees, etc.

References

External links
  http://www.paprenjak.hr

Croatian cuisine